The 2014–15 Indiana State Sycamores basketball team represented Indiana State University during the 2014–15 NCAA Division I men's basketball season. The Sycamores, led by fifth year head coach Greg Lansing, played their home games at the Hulman Center and were members of the Missouri Valley Conference. They finished the season 15–16, 11–7 in MVC play to finish in a tie for third place. They lost in the quarterfinals of the Missouri Valley tournament to Loyola–Chicago.

Previous season 
The Sycamores finished the season 23–11, 12–6 in MVC play to finish in second place. They advanced to the championship game of the Missouri Valley Conference tournament where they lost to Wichita State. They were invited to the National Invitation Tournament where they lost in the first round to Arkansas.

Departures

Incoming Transfers

Recruiting

Roster

Schedule

|-
!colspan=9 style="background:#0F4D92; color:white;"| Exhibition

|-
!colspan=9 style="background:#0F4D92; color:white;"| Regular season

|-
!colspan=9 style="background:#0F4D92; color:white;"| Missouri Valley Conference regular season

|-
!colspan=9 style="background:#0F4D92; color:white;"| Missouri Valley tournament

References

Indiana State Sycamores men's basketball seasons
Indiana State
Syca
Syca